Edge of Madness is a 2002 drama film based on the short story A Wilderness Station, written by Alice Munro.[1] The Canadian film stars Brendan Fehr, Caroline Dhavernas, and Corey Sevier. Written by Charles K. Pitts and Anne Wheeler the film is based on the life of a young women (Annie) who confesses to the murder of her husband.  Annie is selected out of an orphanage to be a part of an arranged marriage and to be a house wife at a homestead.  After countless rapes and times of abuse, George the brother of Simon (Annie's husband), murders Simon.  As the story progresses, Annie confesses to this murder and her life and liberty are put into question.

The movie has not received any specific awards, but Anne Wheeler was awarded the DGC Lifetime Award at the 2016 Directors Guild Canada Awards.  Her awards stemmed from her achievements from films such as Better Than Chocolate, Edge of Madness, and Chi.

Plot
Annie Herron is abused by her husband, Simon, whilst his brother, George, was seemingly helpless to intervene. The film hits an interesting twist when Simon is murdered. Annie is convinced that she is the murderer, even as she gets herself admitted to the gaol in the Fort.

In 1851, Annie is living in an orphanage and is put into an arranged marriage to Simon, who takes her to a homestead which is still being built. He puts her to work cooking and cleaning for him and his brother, George. At night, Simon expects Annie to submit to his rough sexual advances, even raping her several times. George tries to talk to Simon about treating Annie better, but his pleas fall on deaf ears. Simon becomes ever more brutal towards Annie, even beating her while he's in a drunken rage.

Meanwhile, George himself is interested in pursuing Annie, which puts her into emotional turmoil.
Simon's murder culminates these events, with Annie being locked up in the gaol, while a Detective, Henry Mullen, investigates.

Through flashbacks, we learn that George, distraught from witnessing how his brother treated Annie, kills Simon by hitting him in the back with an axe. He brings Simon's body back to the homestead, telling Annie that a tree branch had fallen on him. Annie, by this time, had been driven mad from the beatings and rapes Simon had forced upon her. She hits Simon posthumously on the head with a rock. She and George consummate their feelings. Days later, she admits herself to the gaol, while George has fled the homestead to stay with a neighboring family. After reading the unsent letter from Annie and learning of her abused life, Henry decides to dismiss the investigation of the death of Simon, and let Annie and George live their lives. Henry tells Annie that Sadie is dead, and they share a painful moment and hug each other.

One year later in church, George marries neighbour Treece family's daughter Jenny. Annie finds out while in the gaol that she is pregnant, but is not certain whether the father is Simon or George. George apologizes to Annie for not being there and staying with her, but Annie forgives George. She declares the baby girl as being Simon's child, so that the child will always be welcome and cared for in later life. The film ends where Annie and Henry look at each other and they share a dance in a good moment at a party.

Cast
Brendan Fehr.....Simon Herron
Paul Johansson.....Henry Mullen
Corey Sevier.....George Herron
Jonas Chernick.....William Sellor
Caroline Dhavernas.....Annie Herron
Tantoo Cardinal.....Ruth

Production

Filming 
This movie was filmed in two locations; Minnedosa, Manitoba, Canada, and Winnipeg, Manitoba, Canada.

Release 
Edge of Madness had a relatively small release only being aired on a single screen in Vancouver after being passed by both the Toronto Film Festival and Vancouver Film Festival.  Anne Wheeler described her displeasure for the small release, but attributed it partly to having no major stars in the film

Response 
The film "Edge of Madness" has a limited amount of critical reviews and responses, but enough to form an opinion as well as an overall consensus.  The movie received a 45% on Rotten Tomatoes, and a 6.3/10 of IMDb. Through IMDb there are some viewer responses, many of which state it is a relatively good film for the low budget.  Many of the critical responses have also claimed it was intriguing for a small-budget film, but some parts were rather dull

References

External links

 

Canadian drama films
2002 films
English-language Canadian films
Films about rape
Films based on short fiction
Films about domestic violence
Films based on works by Alice Munro
2000s English-language films
2000s Canadian films